Hall School Wimbledon (HSW) is a co-educational non-selective independent day school in Wimbledon, London, for children aged 5 to 18, with plans to introduce a Sixth Form in September 2022. The school was founded in 1990, by former Headmaster Timothy Hobbs, with only nine pupils. As of August 2020, the school has approximately 150+ pupils.

In September 2018 Hall school Wimbledon was acquired by Chatsworth Schools and the current Headmaster is Andrew Hammond. The Principal is Graeme Delaney.

The 2019 Ofsted Inspection Report states that: "Leaders at all levels wish to build on pupils' current academic success by improving the quality of teaching and learning, with an emphasis on supporting pupils' individual needs and developing their wider skills and experiences."

The Junior School which was located in Putney Vale (SW15) has now been moved to 17, The Downs in Wimbledon (SW20) where the Senior School is located. The school is about 12 minutes' walk from both Wimbledon Chase and Raynes Park overland stations and a 19-minute walk from Wimbledon overground station. The grounds of the school have been beautifully landscaped and include two outdoor courts marked up for netball, hockey, volleyball and five-a-side football, a traversing climbing wall, a garden and a wooden pagoda with benches. The school has its sports ground, the Oberon Fields, situated 10 minutes from the school and offers all major sports as well as having a drama studio/concert room space in the sports pavilion.

The school operates a bus service within the local Wimbledon / Raynes Park area and offers collections and drop-offs further afield.

Admissions process 

Hall School Wimbledon admits pupils of a range of academic abilities, provided that they are judged capable of prospering within the school curriculum (mainstream academic). All prospective parents are encouraged to visit the school prior to registering. Children are not assessed for entry but applicants are interviewed by the Headmaster.

Notable former pupils

Alex Corbisiero, Rugby Union forward for London Irish and England
Jamie Treays, Musician
Tom Rogan, Political Journalist, Washington Examiner
Misty Miller- Singer/Songwriter
Oliver Lindsay-Hague, Harlequins, England 7s, GB 7s Olympic Silver medallist
Will Collier, Harlequins and England Rugby
Beau Gordon, BAFTA winning film producer
Luca Ashby-Hammond, Fulham FC and England U16, 17, 18 Football
Seigo Masuda, Japan U23 National Squash Champion
Chloe Halliday, Wimbledon Tennis
David Millard, Harlequins and Ireland U18, U19, U20 Rugby
Emily Pinkess - ISFA Girls Football
William Jones - England U17, U19 National Badminton Champion

References

Wimbledon Times Report, https://www.wimbledonguardian.co.uk/news/17622719.from-inadequate-to-good-here-is-how-hall-school-wimbledons-new-leaders-turned-things-around/

Inclusive education for all, https://www.timeandleisure.co.uk/inclusive-education-for-all/

Ofsted Report February 2019, https://www.hsw.co.uk/wp-content/uploads/10055383-Hall-School-Wimbledon-101086-Final-PDF.pdf 

Hall School Wimbledon welcomes new sixth form and 'exciting changes', https://www.wimbledonguardian.co.uk/news/18559612.hall-school-wimbledon-welcomes-new-sixth-form-exciting-changes/

John Catt's school directory, https://www.schoolsearch.co.uk/listing/hall-school-wimbledon-london

External links
Hall School Wimbledon official site

1990 establishments in England
Educational institutions established in 1990
Private co-educational schools in London
Private schools in the London Borough of Merton
Private schools in the London Borough of Wandsworth
Wimbledon, London